Lynsey Gallagher (born 20 May 1992) is a Scottish netball player, who currently plays for the Strathclyde Sirens in the Netball Superleague. She was selected to represent the Scotland netball team on various occasions, including the 2019 Netball World Cup.

References

External links
 

1992 births
Living people
Scottish netball players
Place of birth missing (living people)
2019 Netball World Cup players
Sirens Netball players
Netball Superleague players
2015 Netball World Cup players
Netball players at the 2014 Commonwealth Games
Netball players at the 2018 Commonwealth Games
Commonwealth Games competitors for Scotland
20th-century Scottish women
21st-century Scottish women